Pitch in for Baseball and Softball (PIFBS) is a non-profit, 501(c)(3) charity which focuses on the collection and distribution of new and gently used baseball and softball equipment. The collected equipment is then given to youth leagues in underserved communities around the world. Since its inception in the summer of 2005, PIFBS has donated more than $9 million worth of equipment to 800,000+ children in every state in the U.S. and 100 countries internationally. PIFBS has helped leagues in the Dominican Republic, Poland, Haiti, Nicaragua, Ghana, Israel, the Ukraine, India, China and the hurricane affected Gulf Coast region of the United States.

History
PIFBS was founded shortly after Hurricane Katrina. The organization sent donated equipment to the devastated areas to help revive their local youth baseball leagues. PIFBS continues to help communities affected by natural disasters. In June 2011, they donated a great deal of equipment to those in Joplin, Missouri, after the string of tornados in that area. The organization also works with privileged communities including those in the Philadelphia area.

Internationally, PIFBS has sent equipment to Europe and is credited with helping raise the popularity of baseball in Europe. The Uganda little league team competing in the 2012 Little League World Series received its equipment from PIFBS. This is being captured by filmmaker Jay Shapiro for the upcoming documentary Opposite Field.  Shapiro spent two years in Uganda filming baseball players and documenting the country's baseball community.

Notable athletes involved
 Jimmy Rollins
 Derrek Lee
 Carl Pavano
 Michael Cuddyer

References

10. http://mlb.mlb.com/news/article.jsp?ymd=20130702&content_id=52439232&c_id=mlb

Children's charities based in the United States
Sports charities
Charities based in Pennsylvania